Eyes Wide Open (stylized in sentence case) is the second Korean studio album (fourth overall) by South Korean girl group Twice. It was released on October 26, 2020, by JYP Entertainment and Republic Records. It is the group's first Korean full-length album in nearly three years, following Twicetagram (2017). The group's sophomore album features thirteen songs including the lead single, "I Can't Stop Me", and was released on the week of their fifth anniversary.

The album is primarily a pop record with elements of retro-synth, dance-pop, Japanese city-pop, and contemporary R&B genres among others. Production was handled by a wide array of producers including Melanie Fontana, Josh Record, LDN Noise, DJ Swivel, and Dua Lipa, with JYP Entertainment founder J. Y. Park serving as the album's executive producer. Members of the group participated in the production as songwriters for six out of thirteen tracks on the album. Lyrically, the album discusses themes of love, insomnia, self-confidence, self-encouragement, anxiety, and more.

Eyes Wide Open was a commercial success and received generally favorable reviews from music critics, who complimented the wide variety of music genres featured in the album as well as the group's musical growth. The album marked Twice's highest entry at the time on the US Billboard 200, peaking at number 72, and peaked at number 2 on the Gaon Album Chart. In April 2021, Eyes Wide Open received a 2× Platinum certification from the Korean Music Content Association (KMCA). The lead single, "I Can't Stop Me", peaked at number 8 on the Gaon Digital Chart, becoming the group's fourteenth top-ten single, as well as the group's third single to top the Billboard World Digital Song Sales chart. To promote the album, the group performed on several South Korean music show programs, such as M Countdown and Inkigayo.

Background 
Following the release of Twice's commercially successful EP, More & More (2020), reports of an upcoming comeback by the group that would be set for October 26 had been circulating on various Korean media sites. The reports were confirmed by their Korean label, JYP Entertainment, later that day. The album was announced on October 1 via Twice's official SNS accounts, along with the release date and promotional schedule. On October 6, the album's title was announced. On October 10, the tracklist and lead single "I Can't Stop Me" were revealed. The tracklist included member participation in lyrics for a number of tracks as well as participation from LDN Noise, Heize, and Dua Lipa in album's production On October 11, three group teaser images were released alongside the digital album cover.

According to leader Jihyo, the message and the title of the group's album can be written in one phrase: "Eyes wide open to a new sense."

Composition 
Eyes Wide Open is a 13-track album that features various genres, including dance-pop, Japanese city-pop, Latin-pop, and R&B, among others. The album's title track "I Can't Stop Me" was written by J. Y. Park and Shim Eun-ji, and produced by Melanie Fontana and Michel "Lindgren" Schulz. The song features a synthwave genre that mixes European electronic music and American 1980s synth sounds, while lyrically depicting the boundaries of the good and bad of intractable desires. "Hell In Heaven" discusses the feeling of falling in love, comparing it to both hell and heaven. "Up No More", written by Jihyo, describes the struggles of insomnia, with the song being sonically described as bass-heavy. "Do What We Like" was penned by Sana, and is a retro-inspired dance track featuring electronic elements that details an aspiration to remember forgotten memories in a relationship. "Believer" is a EDM-inspired self-encouragement song written by South Korean songwriter Kenzie of SM Entertainment and produced by LDN Noise. "Bring It Back" and "Queen" were written by Dahyun, with the former being an R&B track with heavy electronic influence, and the latter lyrically discussing self-confidence. "Go Hard" was described as a glimpse of the aspirations behind the confidence of each Twice member. "Shot Clock" is described as a "drum (mostly snare), bass, and brass-heavy" track. "Handle It" was composed by Uzoechi Emenike and written by Chaeyoung, and lyrically depicts the feeling of being unable to accept a breakup. "Depend On You" was written by Nayeon, and was described as having a message of comfort in times of anxiety. "Say Something" heavily features Japanese city-pop accompanied with a "groovy electric guitar and bass riffs that are accented by the piano and electric synth keyboard".

English singer-songwriter Dua Lipa participated in the composition of the thirteenth track of the album, "Behind the Mask", along with South Korean singer Heize, who took hand in the songwriting.

"We tried a retro concept for the first time with this album. Our title song, 'I Can't Stop Me,' especially manifests the retro concept with the synth notes that you can hear throughout the song", Twice member Momo said of the album.

Promotion 
On October 17, 2020, JYP Entertainment announced in an official statement that member Jeongyeon would take a hiatus due to "psychological anxiousness", and as a result would not participate in any of the promotional activities for Eyes Wide Open.

On October 19, Twice held a special livestreaming event commemorating their fifth anniversary since debuting named "With (Twice 5th Anniversary Special)", wherein the group performed the song "Say Something", the 12th track from their upcoming studio album. The album was officially released on October 26. To promote Eyes Wide Open, the group appeared and performed on several South Korean music programs, starting with Mnet's M Countdown on October 29, wherein they performed the title track "I Can't Stop Me" and the song "Up No More". They also appeared on KBS2's Music Bank, MBC's Show! Music Core, MBC M's Show Champion, and SBS's Inkigayo, to perform "I Can't Stop Me". Twice also performed the album's title track on their United States television debut on November 30, with their appearance on the "#PlayAtHome" series of The Late Show with Stephen Colbert.

Twice made an appearance at the Time 100 Talks event held by Time magazine on January 28, 2021, where they performed the song "Depend On You".

Critical reception 

Writing for Beats Per Minute, Chase McMullen gave the album a score of 79/100, stating that it solidified "Twice's ever-surprising ability to evolve" and described the material as containing the group's "most sophisticated sound and presentation yet, seeing them grow beyond youthful exuberance to deliver pop with a bit more of a weathered, knowing edge". The same website included Eyes Wide Open in its "Top 50 Albums of 2020" list, ranking at number 45, with author JT Early complimenting the group's greater creative control over the album and how they tackled a variety of different genres.

The album was included by Time magazine in its "Songs and Albums That Defined K-Pop's Monumental Year in 2020" list, describing the strength of all 13 tracks and their running theme of light against darkness. Writer Kat Moon further praised Twice, stating that "even as they sing about inner turmoil, the words are expressed through sweet-toned voices and upbeat tunes—giving the listener a reassuring, revitalizing hug." Tamar Herman of the South China Morning Post included Eyes Wide Open in her "Top 15 K-pop group albums of 2020", citing on the material's emphasis on Twice's dedication to "more mature, dramatic pop perfection as the nine women seamlessly glide between a medley of genres". Billboard magazine included the studio album in its "10 Best K-Pop Albums of 2020: Critics' Picks" at number 6, describing Twice as having hit a "new artistic high" and citing the variety of genres that can be found in the material. Lai Frances of MTV News described the album as the "bigger, bolder sister of More & More" with the tracklist as being able to "take listeners on a sonic journey through space and time".

Mike Wass of Idolator included Eyes Wide Open in the music blog's "70 Best Pop Albums of 2020" list, ranking at number 41. Riddhi Chakraborty from Rolling Stone India ranked the album at number 2 in the magazine's "10 Best K-pop Albums of 2020", describing it as a "smorgasbord of hardcore drops, haunting melodies and outstanding vocal flexes", and further referring to the album as Twice's "best record to date".

Natasha Ho of the South China Morning Post Youngpost praised all 13 tracks of the album as being able to showcase the group's talent, citing the song "Depend On You" as the highlight, but was less optimistic on the track sequencing, stating that the "genre and emotion changes between songs too quickly, not giving listeners a chance to adjust."

Commercial performance 
Eyes Wide Open reached its peak position of number 2 on the Weekly Gaon Album Chart on its chart issue ending October 31, 2020. The album was the 5th best-selling album on the Hanteo Chart for the month of October, selling 107,345 copies on its first day before garnering a total of 227,883 copies sold by the end of the month. Two months after the release of Eyes Wide Open, the album debuted at number 72 on the US Billboard 200, marking the group's highest entry on the chart, surpassing More & More (2020), as well as making Twice only the third K-pop girl group to break within the top 100 of the chart, after 2NE1 and Blackpink. The album also reached number 2 on the Billboard World Albums chart and number 12 on the Billboard Top Album Sales chart. On April 8, 2021, the album received a 2× Platinum certification from the Korea Music Content Association for reaching sales of over 500,000 copies. It became the group's second release to receive a 2× Platinum certification, following More & More.

Track listing 

Notes

Personnel 
Credits adapted from Tidal and album liner notes.

Vocals

Twice – lead vocals
Perrie – background vocals 
Sophia Pae – background vocals 
Kim Yeon-seo – background vocals 
earattack – background vocals 

Instrumentation

Michel "Lindgren" Schulz – bass, synthesizer 
Shim Eun-ji – keyboard 
Lee Hae-sol – synthesizer 
Lee Woo-min "collapsedone" – bass, electric piano, guitar, synthesizer 
earattack – bass, drum, keyboard, synthesizer 
Gongdo – bass, drum, keyboard, synthesizer 
Armadillo – programming 
Adam Rust – guitar 
Adrian X – guitar 
Jung Sang-min – keyboard 
Lee Seong-chan – bass 
Candace Sosa – guitar 
Iggy –  guitar 
Jung Ho-hyeon – keyboard 
Choi Hun – bass 
Kim So-hyun – chorus 

Production

J. Y. Park "The Asiansoul" – executive producer
Melanie Fontana – producer 
Michel "Lindgren" Schulz – producer, arranger 
A Wright – producer 
Shim Eun-ji – producer, arranger, vocal producer 
Lee Hae-sol – producer, arranger 
Linnea Södahl – producer 
Lee Woo-min "collapsedone" – producer, arranger 
Julia Ross – producer, vocal arranger 
Kyrsta Youngs – producer, arranger, vocal arranger 
Kim Yeon-seo – vocal producer 
Rod Radwagon – producer, arranger 
Grace Barker – producer, arranger 
Josh Record – producer , arranger 
Jarly – producer 
Sophia Pae – vocal producer 
earattack – producer, arranger 
Gongdo – producer, arranger 
Laurell Barker – producer 
Katya Edwards – producer 
Kenzie – producer, arranger 
Greg Bonnick – producer, arranger 
Hayden Chapman – producer, arranger 
Alice Penrose – producer, arranger 
JinbyJin – producer, arranger 
Cazzi Opeia – producer 
Ellen Berg – producer 
Grace Tither – producer, arranger 
Carl Ryden – producer, arranger 
Ki Fitzgerald – producer, arranger 
Paul Harris – producer, arranger 
Jonatan Gusmark – producer, arranger 
Ludvig Evers – producer, arranger 
Kim Yeon-seo – producer 
Adrian X – producer 
Elizabeth Loughrey – producer 
Ryan Ashley – producer 
Uzoechi Emenike – producer 
Armadillo – producer, arranger 
Candace Sosa – producer, arranger 
Jordan "DJ Swivel" Young – producer, arranger 
Sean R Mullen – producer, arranger 
James Kaye Miller – producer, arranger 
Oranji  – arranger 
Jung Ho-hyun (e.one) – producer, arranger 
Iggy – producer, arranger, vocal producer 
Sam Klempner – producer, arranger 
Jacob Attwooll – producer, arranger 
Dua Lipa – producer 

Technical

Choi Hye-jin – recording engineer  , digital editor , mixing engineer  
Eom Se-hee – recording engineer 
Lee Sang-yeop – recording engineer , digital editor 
Park Eun-jeong – recording engineer 
Iggy – recording engineer 
Lee Tae-seop – mixing engineer  
Tony Maserati – mixing engineer 
Yoon Won-kwon – mixing engineer  
Shin Bong-won – mixing engineer 
Master Key – mixing engineer 
Ku Jong-pil – mixing engineer 
Im Hong-jin – mixing engineer , digital editor 
Jordan "DJ Swivel" Young – mixing engineer 
David K. Younghoon – assistant mixing engineer 
Chris Gehringer – mastering engineer 
Kwon Nam-woo – mastering engineer 
Michel "Lindgren" Schulz – programming 
Shim Eun-ji – digital editing 
Lee Woo-min "collapsedone" – programming, digital editor 
Jeong Yu-ra at Anemone Studio – mixing engineer , digital editor 
Iggy – recording engineer

Charts

Weekly charts

Year-end charts

Certifications

Release history

See also 
 List of 2020 albums
 List of certified albums in South Korea
 List of K-pop albums on the Billboard charts

References 

2020 albums
Twice (group) albums
JYP Entertainment albums
IRiver albums
Republic Records albums
Korean-language albums